Czarna Góra , is a village in the administrative district of Gmina Bukowina Tatrzańska, within Tatra County, Lesser Poland Voivodeship, in southern Poland, close to the border with Slovakia.

The village has a population of 1,506.

It is one of the 14 villages in the Polish part of the historical region of Spiš (Polish: Spisz).

References

Villages in Tatra County
Spiš
Kraków Voivodeship (1919–1939)